The Vermont Symphony Orchestra (VSO) is a symphony orchestra based in, and supported in part by, the U.S. state of Vermont. It is a 501(c)(3) corporation. It is one of the few, and the oldest, state-supported symphony orchestras in the United States.

Organization
In 2007 it had 55 full-time musicians. It presented 40 concerts a year. Its budget was $1.5 million annually. For fiscal year 2009, the state of Vermont budget contained a $125,402 grant.

History
It was founded in Woodstock in 1934. It was invited to perform at the New York World's Fair, in 1939.

It performed in each of the state's 251 cities and towns between 1984 and 1986.

Efrain Guigui led the orchestra from 1974 to 1989. Kate Tamarkin was music director from 1991 to 1999. The current director, Jaime Laredo, was appointed in 2000.

Mission
A part of the founding mission of the VSO is to make symphonic music accessible, at an affordable cost, to Vermont's mostly rural citizens. The Vermont Symphony Orchestra does not have a single home hall.

Chartered to bring music to the citizenry, the VSO performs in a broad range of settings including Robert Todd Lincoln's estate Hildene, the public lawn of the Vermont State House at Montpelier, the Flynn Center in Burlington, Shelburne Farms on the shore of Lake Champlain in Shelburne, Vermont, Trapp Concert Meadow and many town commons, opera houses and university art centers including Johnson State College, Middlebury College, Castleton State College, Lyndon State College, and the University of Vermont.

The VSO has extensive educational outreach with its Musicians-in-the-Schools and Orchestral Youth Concerts programs.

Jaime Laredo has been music director since 2000.

See also
Vermont Mozart Festival

References

External links
Vermont Symphony Orchestra

American orchestras
Musical groups established in 1934
Musical groups from Vermont
Wikipedia requested audio of orchestras
Performing arts in Vermont
1934 establishments in Vermont